Herbert Stell (3 November 1885 – 6 May 1967) was a gymnast who represented Great Britain at the 1908 Summer Olympics.

Stell was one of the 45 gymnasts who competed for the men's team event in London at the 1908 Summer Olympics. The team finished eighth out of the eight teams.

After the Olympics Stell became a physical education instructor at the Liverpool Institute High School for Boys and would eventually become head of the department, a position he held for 35 years.

References

1885 births
1967 deaths
British male artistic gymnasts
Gymnasts at the 1908 Summer Olympics
Olympic gymnasts of Great Britain